Peter Andrew Kollman (July 24, 1944–May 25, 2001) was a professor of chemistry and pharmaceutical chemistry at the University of California, San Francisco.

He is known for his work in computational chemistry, molecular modeling and bioinformatics, especially for his role in the development of the AMBER force field and molecular dynamics software package.

Biography
Kollman obtained his B.A. from Grinnell College in 1966 and his M.A. and Ph.D. from Princeton University in 1967 and 1970 respectively. His PhD supervisor was Leland C. Allen, who had received his PhD in 1956 from MIT supervised by John C. Slater. After a post-doctoral position at the University of Cambridge with David Buckingham, Kollman was hired as an assistant professor by UCSF, where he spent the rest of his career.

In 1995, he was distinguished with the Computers in Chemistry Award from the American Chemical Society.

He was awarded the UCSF medal in 2018.

References

External links
Nature obituary of Peter Kollman
Biophysical Journal obituary of Peter Kollman
San Francisco Chronicle obituary of Peter Kollman
American Chemical Society Division of Computers in Chemistry obituary of Peter Kollman
 UCSF today obituary of Peter Kollman
Peter Kollman at the Academic Family Tree

1944 births
2001 deaths
20th-century American chemists
University of California, San Francisco faculty
Computational chemists